The 2021 FIS Telemark World Championships was the 23rd edition of the telemark skiing event, organised by the International Ski Federation (FIS). The championships were held from 18 to 21 March 2021 in Melchsee-Frutt, Switzerland.

Medal summary

Medal table

Men

Women

Team

References

External links
Official website

2021
2021 in Swiss sport
International sports competitions hosted by Switzerland
World Telemarking Championships